Reba McEntire's The Hammer is a 2023 American television film starring Reba McEntire as Kim Wheeler, the newly appointed 5th District Judge of Nevada. The film is inspired by the life of Kim Wanker, one of the last traveling circuit judges in the U.S. The film premiered on January 7, 2023, on Lifetime.

Cast
Reba McEntire as Kim Wheeler
Melissa Peterman as Kris
 Kay Shioma Metchie as Vicky
 Rex Linn as Bart Crawford
 Matty Finochio as Ellis Dinkins
 Vanesa Tomasino as Melba Long
 Jill Morrison as Jo

Production
In June 2022, it was reported that Reba McEntire will star and also an executive producer the new Lifetime movie The Hammer. The project marks McEntire's reunion with her Reba co-star Melissa Peterman. Also was cast McEntire's real-life boyfriend, Rex Linn, and Kay Shioma Metchie. McEntire and Linn met in 1991 when they worked on the television movie The Gambler.

References

External links

2023 television films
Lifetime (TV network) films
2023 films
2020s English-language films
American drama television films
Films about real people